Mountain View is an unincorporated community in Chaves County, New Mexico, United States.

References

Unincorporated communities in Chaves County, New Mexico
Unincorporated communities in New Mexico